Procometis brunnea is a moth in the family Autostichidae. It was described by West in 1931. It is found in Taiwan.

References

Moths described in 1931
Procometis